The 1993 Benson and Hedges Open was a men's ATP tennis tournament held in Auckland, New Zealand and played on outdoor hard courts. It was part of the World Series of the 1993 ATP Tour. It was the 26th edition of the tournament and was held from 11 January until 18 January 1993. Second-seeded Alexander Volkov won the singles title.

Finals

Singles

 Alexander Volkov defeated  MaliVai Washington 7–6(7–2), 6–4
 It was Volkov's only title of the year and the 2nd of his career.

Doubles

 Grant Connell /  Patrick Galbraith defeated  Alex Antonitsch /  Alexander Volkov 6–3, 7–6
 It was Connell's 1st title of the year and the 5th of his career. It was Galbraith's 1st title of the year and the 13th of his career.

References

External links 
 
 ATP – tournament profile
 ITF tournament edition details

Heineken Open
Heineken
ATP Auckland Open
January 1993 sports events in New Zealand